Beibarys Hockey Club, commonly referred as Beibarys Atyrau, are a professional ice hockey team based in Atyrau, Kazakhstan. They were founded in 2009, and play in the Pro Hokei Ligasy, the top level of ice hockey in Kazakhstan.

Season-by-season record 
For the full season-by-season history, see List of Beibarys Atyrau seasons.

Note: GP = Games played, W = Wins, L = Losses, OTW = Overtime/shootout wins, OTL = Overtime/shootout losses, Pts = Points, GF = Goals for, GA = Goals against

Achievements

Kazakhstan Hockey Championship:
Winners (4): 2010–11, 2011–12, 2015–16, 2018–19
Runners-up (2): 2009–10, 2012–13

Kazakhstan Hockey Cup:
Runners-up (1): 2012

IIHF Continental Cup
Runners-up (1): 2016–17

Notable players
Mike Danton (born 1980), Canadian ice hockey player
Māris Jučers (born 1987), Latvian ice hockey player 
Eliezer Sherbatov (born 1991), Canadian-Israeli ice hockey player

Head coaches
Alexander Istomin 2009–present

References

External links

 
Ice hockey teams in Kazakhstan
Atyrau